Life on Earth is the seventh studio album by American R&B singer-songwriter Musiq Soulchild. It was released on April 15, 2016, by eOne Music. It is the first album to be released on an independent label, after previously recording several albums on Def Jam Recordings and Atlantic Records. The album entered the US Billboard 200 at number 27.

Background
After finishing out his contract with the Atlantic Records for the release of his 2011's album MusiqInTheMagiq, Musiq signed with Warryn Campbell's record label My Block Records. However, in June 2014, he emerged as a rapper under the pseudonym The Husel. At the time, he planned to release an album under the name, with guest appearances from Pastor Troy, T-Pain, Bone Crusher and Cash Out, among others. He later released the project as a free EP with five songs. The move caused Musiq to receive heavy amounts of criticism on Twitter. During the backlash, he defended his career change, saying it was primarily due to the change in the music landscape where R&B music's popularity has waned.

Track listing

Samples
 "Wait A Minute" contains a sample of "Rapper Dapper Snapper", as performed by Edwin Birdsong and "The Champ" by The Mohawks
 "Heart Away" contains a sample of "Don't Change Your Love", as performed by The Five Stairsteps
 "Loving You" contains a sample of "Lovin' You", as performed by Tony! Toni! Toné!

Personnel
Credits adapted from liner notes.

 Musiq Soulchild – primary artist, writer, producer, executive producer, background vocals, vocal production
 Warryn Campbell – producer, writer, instrumentation, executive producer
 Rapsody – additional vocals
 Joi Campbell – writer, additional vocals
 J. Troy – additional instruments and programming
 Alisson Whyld – guitar
 Willie Hyn – additional vocals
 Payge Cooper – drums
 Julian McGuire – guitar
 Rodney Jones, Jr. – bass
 Chris Payton – guitar
 Dontae Winslow – horns, horn arrangement
 Bruce Buechner – recording engineer
 Dan Cohen – recording engineer
 Leo Sibilly – recording engineer
 Blake Eiseman – mixing
 Colin Leonard – mastering

Charts

Weekly charts

Year-end charts

References

2016 albums
Musiq Soulchild albums
E1 Music albums
Albums produced by Warryn Campbell